Union Mills is an unincorporated community in Mahaska County, in the U.S. state of Iowa.

History 
A post office was established at Union Mills in 1848, and was discontinued in 1857. The post office was reestablished in 1863 and was discontinued in 1907; it was briefly known as Widow's Home.

The population of Union Mills was estimated at 50 in 1887, was 60 in 1902, and was 52 in 1925.

References 

Unincorporated communities in Mahaska County, Iowa
Unincorporated communities in Iowa